K